Carlos Luis Vasallo Tomé (born 18 October 1950 in Valencia) is a Spanish businessman and audiovisual producer resident in Miami.

Biography
Carlos Luis Vasallo Tomé was born on 18 October 1950 in Valencia, Spain. He was one of the eight children of the Spanish writer and also screenwriter Jesús Vasallo (1919–1993). His father was from Ciudad Rodrigo (Castile and León), and her mother from Teixeiro (Galicia). At 14, he settled in Madrid to work in theater and cinema. Soon he started producing, and moved to Mexico. He was married the Mexican actresses, Tere Velázquez and Susana Dosamantes. Now, he lives in Miami.

Carlos Vasallo founded VasalloVision, and is the presidente and CEO of América CV Network, América TeVe, TeVeo, and Radio Caracol 1260 am. He is also the largest owner of Mexican movies, and in 2021 has sued Google and YouTube for playing his movies without permission.

Filmography

Actor 
 Los guardiamarinas (1967)
 Aquí mando yo (1967)
 ¿Es usted el asesino? (1967)
 Juicio de faldas (1969)
 Golpe de mano (Explosión) (1970)
 El diablo Cojuelo (1971)
 Tirarse al monte (1971)
 La cera virgen (1972)
 Minutos después (1976)

Writer 
 Manaos (1979)
 La conquista de la tierra perdida (Conquest) (1983)
 Goma-2 (1984)
 Escuadrón: Counterforce (1988)
 A puño limpio (1989)
 Leyendas del Exilio (2017)

Director 
 El día de los asesinos (1979)
 El día del compadre (1983)
 Gregorio Walerstein: El zar (2009)

References

External links

1950 births
Miramax people
People from Valencia
20th-century Spanish male actors
Theatre managers and producers
Spanish film producers
Film studio executives
Film production company founders
Living people
Spanish emigrants to Mexico